Rhododendron sect. Pentanthera is a section of subgenus Pentanthera in the genus Rhododendron. It comprises 15-16 species of deciduous shrubs native to temperate regions of the Northern Hemisphere.

It includes two subsections:
 Pentathera
 Sinensia

Subsection Pentanthera (16 species)

Species

Subsection Sinensia (1 species)
Selected species
Rhododendron molle (syn. R. japonicum)

The section is closely related to sect. Rhodora, differing from it in the flower corolla having five fully developed lobes, whereas sect. Rhodora has the upper three lobes joined into a single three-lipped lobe.

Cultivation
Most (but not all) of the cultivated azaleas belong to species in this section, and hybrids derived from them.

References
Germplasm Resources Information Network: Rhododendron sect. Pentanthera
Huxley, A., ed. (1992). New RHS Dictionary of Gardening. Macmillan.

Pentanthera
Plant sections
Historically recognized angiosperm taxa